Mohamed Habib Attia (born 1983), is a Tunisian film producer. He is best known as the producer of critically acclaimed films Falastine Stereo, It Was Better Tomorrow and Le Challat de Tunis.

Personal life
He was born in 1983 in Tunis, Tunisia.

Career
In 2009, he co-produced the film Laila's Birthday as an international production with Palestine and Netherlands. The film was directed by Rashid Masharawi. In 2011, Attia produced No More Fear directed by Mourad Ben Cheikh made official selection at the Cannes Film Festival and subsequently in Busan, Taormina, Sheffield, Dubai film festivals. In 2012, his film It Was Better Tomorrow directed by Hinde Boujemaa was premiered at the official selection at the Venice Film Festival, and won the Best Arab Director award in Dubai International Film Festival. In 2013, he produced the Rashid Masharawi's film Falastine Stereo. It was officially selected in Toronto, Dubai and Chicago film festivals.

In 2016, he joined with Zaineb n'aime Pas la Neigh directed by Kaouther Ben Hania. The film had its world premiere at the Locarno International Film Festival, and won the Tanit d'or award at the Carthage Cinematographic Days as well as the prize for Best Documentary at Cinemed Montpellier. In 2014, his production Le Challaat de Tunis opened the ACID section at the Cannes festival and won the prize for Best First Film at the Namur Festival, for Best Director and Best Film in Beirut. The film was officially selected in Dubai, San Sebastian and Busan film festivals and theatrically distributed in more than 15 countries.

In 2017, he collaborated for another international co-production, Beauty and the Dogs. The film was screened in the Un Certain Regard section at the 2017 Cannes Film Festival. It was later selected as the Tunisian entry for the Best Foreign Language Film at the 91st Academy Awards, but it was not nominated. It was later obtained the Prize for best sound creation, he subsequently won the prize for best film in Student Jury at the Angoulême Francophone Film Festival.

He is the CEO of film production company, 'Cinétéléfilms' since 2007. The company was established in 1983. In 2018, he produced We Could Be Heroes directed by Hind Bensari. The film won the grand prize at Hot Docs Canadian International Documentary Festival.

Filmography

References

External links
 
 Habib Attia: Producer
 Habib Attia حبيب عطية

Living people
1983 births
Tunisian film producers